Pedan may refer to:
Mount Pedan, also known as Mount Livadiyskaya, Russia
Pedan (subdistrict), in Indonesia

Persons with the surname
Galina Pedan (born 1983), Kyrgyz athlete
Igor Pedan (active in 2000s), Ukrainian-born Russian strongman